Duntryleague passage tomb, also known as Dermot & Grania's Bed, is a passage grave and National Monument located atop Duntryleague Hill, County Limerick, Ireland.

Location

Duntryleague Passage Tomb is located atop Duntryleague Hill,  WNW of Galbally, County Limerick. The hill overlooks the River Loobagh valley to the north.

History

Duntryleague passage tomb was built c. 3500 BC.

According to legend, it was the burial place of Ailill Aulom (Oilill Olum), a King of Munster.

Description

The covering cairn is missing but most of the capstones are still in place. The tomb is aligned north-south. It is built in a style suggestive of similar tombs in Brittany.

References

National Monuments in County Limerick
Archaeological sites in County Limerick
Tombs in the Republic of Ireland